Deviant behavior may refer to

 Deviance (sociology), actions or behaviors that violate social norms
 Deviant Behavior (journal), an interdisciplinary journal which focuses on social deviance
 Deviant Behavior (book), a textbook by American sociologist Erich Goode